Ludington Airline (also, Ludington Lines or Ludington Line) was an airline of northeastern United States started on an investment of at least $1,000,000 from Charles Townsend Ludington and his brother.

Ludington brochures advertised "Plane Service, like Train Service" as their mode of operation.

References

Further reading 
 
 
 Smithsonian on Earhart
 
 New York Times, Tues., January 25, 1966, Page 41 "Nicholas S. Ludington, 61, Dies; Philadelphian Founded Airline"

External links 
 Ludington Airline schedule

Defunct airlines of the United States
1933 disestablishments in Pennsylvania
American companies established in 1929
Airlines established in 1929
Airlines disestablished in 1933
American companies disestablished in 1933